Strawberry Island is an island on Raquette Lake in Hamilton County, New York. It is located northeast of Raquette Lake. St Hubert Island is located northeast of Strawberry Island.

References

Islands of New York (state)
Islands of Hamilton County, New York